The 1985 Montana State Bobcats football team was an American football team that represented Montana State University in the Big Sky Conference during the 1985 NCAA Division I-AA football season. In their third season under head coach Dave Arnold, the Bobcats compiled a 2–9 record (1–6 against Big Sky opponents) and finished last in the Big Sky.

Schedule

References

Montana State
Montana State Bobcats football seasons
Montana State Bobcats football